Horningtoft is a village and civil parish in the English county of Norfolk.
For the purposes of local government, it falls within the district of Breckland.

The villages name means 'Curtilage of the Horningas (= dwellers at the horn-shaped piece of land)'.

The village approximately 5 miles north of East Dereham.  It is close to the villages of Whissonsett and Brisley.  The village has a Danish Camp to its eastern end.

Notable residents 
 Legendary English cricketer Fuller Pilch (1804–1870) was born in the village.

Notes 

http://kepn.nottingham.ac.uk/map/place/Norfolk/Horningtoft

Breckland District
Villages in Norfolk
Civil parishes in Norfolk